Messier 95, also known as M95 or NGC 3351, is a barred spiral galaxy about 33 million light-years away in the zodiac constellation Leo. It was discovered by Pierre Méchain in 1781, and catalogued by compatriot Charles Messier four days later. In 2012 its most recent supernova was discovered.

The galaxy has a morphological classification of SB(r)b, with the SBb notation indicating it is a barred spiral with arms that are intermediate on the scale from tightly to loosely wound, and an "(r)" meaning an inner ring surrounds the bar. The spiral structure extends outward from the ring.

The star formation is occurring in at least five regions with diameters between 100 and 150 pc that are composed of several star clusters ranging in size from 1.7 to 4.9 pc. These individual clusters contain  of stars, and may be on the path to forming globular clusters.

A Type II supernova, designated as SN 2012aw, was discovered within in 2012. The light curve of this displayed great flattening after 27 days, thus classifying it as a Type II-P, or "plateau", core-collapse supernova. The disappearance of the progenitor star was later confirmed from near-infrared imaging of the region.

M95 is one of several galaxies within the M96 Group, a group of galaxies in the constellation Leo, the other Messier objects of which are M96 and M105.

See also
 List of Messier objects

References

External links

 
 SEDS: Spiral Galaxy M95
 
 

Barred spiral galaxies
Messier 095
Messier 095
095
Messier 095
05850
32007
17810320
Discoveries by Pierre Méchain